Hartlepool  is a borough constituency represented in the House of Commons of the UK Parliament by Jill Mortimer of the Conservative Party from 2021. The constituency covers the town of Hartlepool plus nearby settlements.

Labour won every contest for the seat since the first at the February 1974 election (and mostly won the predecessor constituency of The Hartlepools from the 1945 election onward) until Mortimer won the 2021 by-election, becoming the first Conservative MP to represent Hartlepool since 1959.

Boundaries

1974–1983 
The County Borough of Hartlepool.

Before 1974 the seat was known as The Hartlepools (reflecting the representation of both old Hartlepool and West Hartlepool). The name was changed following the merger in 1967 of the County Borough of West Hartlepool and the Municipal Borough of Hartlepool to form the County Borough of Hartlepool.

1983–present 
The Borough of Hartlepool.

As a result of major local government boundary changes in 1974 arising from the Local Government Act 1972, the Borough of Hartlepool was incorporated into the new county of Cleveland. As a consequence, a small part of the pre-1983 Easington constituency was added to the seat.

The seat is currently coterminous with the borough of Hartlepool, which has close to the average population for a UK parliamentary constituency. The seat includes the town of Hartlepool itself and the nearby villages of Hart, Elwick, Greatham, Newton Bewley and Dalton Piercy.

History 

The constituency had previously substantially been in the constituency of The Hartlepools. It became the constituency of Hartlepool in 1974.

Hartlepool was a Labour constituency from its creation until 2021, although its predecessor did have Conservative MPs both in the early 1960s and during the Second World War. At the 1992 general election, Edward Leadbitter stood down and was succeeded by the former Labour Director of Communications Peter Mandelson. Mandelson's pivotal role in the reshaping of the Labour Party into New Labour attracted much attention, and he became a prominent target.

During the first term of the Labour government led by Tony Blair, Mandelson was twice appointed to the Cabinet and twice forced to resign amid minor but controversial scandals. At the 2001 general election there was a notable contest when Arthur Scargill, former leader of the National Union of Mineworkers and the leader of the Socialist Labour Party, stood for election in the hope of exploiting uneasiness about New Labour in "traditional" Labour heartlands. In the event, Mandelson retained his seat, while Scargill polled only 912 votes. Mandelson shocked many with a triumphalist victory speech in which he declared "They underestimated Hartlepool, and they underestimated me, because I am a fighter and not a quitter!".

The following year, the town's first direct Mayoral election generated surprise when the mascot of Hartlepool United F.C., H'Angus the Monkey (real name Stuart Drummond) was elected on a platform that included free bananas for schoolchildren.

Mandelson resigned as MP for Hartlepool when he was appointed as a European Commissioner in the summer of 2004. This triggered a by-election that took place on 30 September. The Hartlepool by-election – the last held prior to the 2005 general election – saw Iain Wright retain the seat for Labour with a majority of 2,033 votes. That by-election marked the first time that the United Kingdom Independence Party had ever finished in third place at a by-election.

The Labour Party has continued to hold the seat since the by-election, with a dwindling majority and falling share of the vote, and at the three most recent general elections, three parties have finished in second place: the Liberal Democrats in 2005 (following their strong performance at the by-election the previous year), the Conservative Party in 2010, and UKIP, going one better than its by-election showing, in 2015.

In May 2010, the Conservatives gained their largest percentage vote increase in the country in Hartlepool, reducing the Labour majority to just over 5,500, whilst in 2015, UKIP recorded their eleventh-highest vote share in the United Kingdom, taking 28% and reducing the Labour majority to just over 3,000 votes.

2010 general election
Both the 2010 and 2015 general elections (in addition to several local elections) took place against the backdrop of concerns regarding the potential closure of Hartlepool and Stockton hospitals and their replacement with a new "super hospital" in out of town Wynyard. This precipitated the closure of several departments, and the removal of services from Hartlepool. The move was initially supported by Hartlepool MP Iain Wright, and opposed by Stockton South candidate James Wharton at the 2010 general election. A substantial protest group was formed opposing Wynyard, and calling on services to remain at Hartlepool, backed by a campaign by the Hartlepool Mail, a local newspaper.

Following the recession of 2008, the incoming coalition government announced it would scrap the Wynyard proposals, although no guarantees were made regarding the future of Hartlepool hospital. This issue continued to dominate politics in Hartlepool at both general elections and local council elections, which dented support for Iain Wright and Labour, who had backed the Wynyard plans, whilst many independent candidates gained traction.

At the 2010 general election, the Conservative Party approached Alan Wright, a regional broadcaster for the BBC and columnist for the Hartlepool Mail, to stand as its candidate, despite his lack of political and campaigning experience, hoping that his high-profile would help. It was also noted that the similarity of his name to that of the town's MP, and the fact he would feature above him on the ballot paper, might result in additional votes. The Conservative Party gained a swing of 16.7%, the largest in the country, taking second place from the Liberal Democrats, and garnering it a vote share far exceeding their traditional local support.

2015 general election
Sitting MP Iain Wright was the only candidate from 2010 to remain on the much-extended ballot paper in 2015, in which the three main parties faced competition from UKIP, the Green Party, and three independent candidates, each standing primarily on healthcare-related platforms.

Popular local taxi driver and charity fundraiser Stephen Picton put himself forward as the voice of the hospital campaigners, although this was challenged by the last-minute candidacy of Sandra Allison, who stood under the banner of 'Your Vote Could Save Our Hospital'. John Hobbs, an 80 year old autism campaigner stood under the tagline 'Tell it like it is'.

UKIP earmarked Hartlepool as a potential gain, and the seat became one of its top ten national targets as well as its main target in the north-east, attracting significant party funding, visits from leader Nigel Farage, and the regional party conference. It selected Philip Broughton, a former Stockton Conservative Councillor and wrestling entrepreneur, as its candidate. The Conservative Party selected public affairs consultant and competitive swimmer, Richard Royal, as its candidate.

The Conservative Party's national '40/40 strategy' meant that much of its regional resources were directed towards the marginal seats of Stockton South and Middlesbrough South and East Cleveland, forcing candidates to campaign outside of their selected seats. The Green Party selected local member Michael Holt, who had been arrested the previous year for obstructing a police officer at a protest in London, although charges were subsequently dropped. Just days before the nomination deadline, the Liberal Democrats selected Darlington-based Hilary Allen as its candidate.

On Valentines Day in 2015, a 'We Love Our Hospital' rally was organised by Save Our Hospital and the Teesside Peoples' Assembly Against Austerity, attracting large crowds in Hartlepool town centre. Candidates Iain Wright, Richard Royal, Philip Broughton, Stephen Picton and Michael Holt each gave speeches alongside other selected speakers. It was reported that Wright was booed and heckled by the crowd.

One day prior to the general election, local football club Hartlepool United F.C. took the unprecedented step of openly criticising Wright, and seemingly encouraging fans to support either Royal or Broughton, both of whom had met the club's leadership and shown support for its interests. The club had been under pressure, facing relegation and had an ongoing land dispute with the Labour council.

Throughout the campaign, both Phillip Broughton and Richard Royal sought to portray themselves as the only viable alternative to Iain Wright, with Broughton distributing leaflets claiming that the Hartlepool election was a 'two horse race', and Royal referring to the close 2010 result, with his slogan "Wright for your town? Wrong for your future. Turn Hartlepool Royal Blue". As a result, much of the anti Labour vote was split, with UKIP and the Conservatives gaining a combined 48.9% compared to Iain Wright's 35.6%, but neither taking enough votes individually to defeat Labour. At one point during election night itself, the vote looked so close that a recount was reported to be due, but this proved to be unnecessary after the inclusion of postal votes.

2017 general election
Following the 2015 general election result, Hartlepool became the 35th most vulnerable Labour seat in the country. At the EU referendum in 2016 Hartlepool voted to 'Leave' by 69.5%, making it one of the highest Leave-voting Labour-held seats in the UK. Despite this intense Euroscepticism in the area making it perceived as a vulnerable seat for Labour, at the 2017 general election Labour's new candidate Mike Hill retained the seat, with UKIP's vote falling by 17 points and Labour's rising by 17 points. This gave Labour their biggest total vote and popular vote majority in Hartlepool since 2001.

Following an allegation of sexual assault made against him in September 2019, Hill sat as an Independent. However, three weeks later, the allegation was withdrawn, and he had the Labour whip restored.

2021 by-election

On 16 March 2021 Mike Hill  resigned as the MP for Hartlepool, triggering a by-election. The election was won by Jill Mortimer of the Conservative Party. It is the first time the Conservatives have held the seat.

Members of Parliament

Elections

Elections in the 2020s

The result was the biggest swing towards an incumbent governing party in a by-election in the post war era; the record was formerly the 1945 Bournemouth by-election.

Elections in the 2010s

Elections in the 2000s

Elections in the 1990s

Elections in the 1980s

Elections in the 1970s

See also 
 List of parliamentary constituencies in Cleveland
 History of parliamentary constituencies and boundaries in Cleveland
 History of parliamentary constituencies and boundaries in Durham

Notes

References
Specific

General
Craig, F. W. S. (1983). British parliamentary election results 1918–1949 (3 ed.). Chichester: Parliamentary Research Services. .

Politics of the Borough of Hartlepool
Parliamentary constituencies in North East England
Parliamentary constituencies in County Durham
Constituencies of the Parliament of the United Kingdom established in 1974